Faith & Disease was a Seattle-based ethereal wave music project who released their debut CD "Beauty and Bitterness" in 1994. Its core members are Eric Cooley  (guitar/bass, songwriter, producer) and Dara Rosenwasser (vocalist, lyricist, co-writer).

Biography
The band was originally signed to Seattle indie label Ivy Records and more recently Projekt Records. They have released six full-length albums and dozens of compilation appearances including an EP with electronic artist Jeff Greinke Dream The Red Clouds released on Italian label Amplexus Records to their credit. Faith & Disease (aka Faith and Disease) played 300+ live shows during their time, including appearances at Bumbershoot, Folklife, headlining at the Convergence festival, NXNW, and an invite to the 1999 CMJ Music Festival, and extensive tours of the US in 1998, 1999 and 2001. They played their final show on March 23, 2006, at Seattle's Neumos. No reunion plans have been set.

Discography

Studio albums
Beauty and Bitterness (Ivy Records, 1994)
Fortune His Sleep (Ivy Records, 1995)
Livesongs: Third Body (Ivy Records, 1995)
Insularia (Ivy Records, 1998)
Lamentations: A Collection (Ivy Records, 1999)
Beneath the Trees (Projekt Records,  2000)
Dream The Red Clouds (Amplexus Records, 2002)
''Passport to Kunming"(Projekt Records, 2003)

External links
 Faith & Disease FB page

American gothic rock groups
Dream pop musical groups
Rock music groups from Washington (state)
Projekt Records artists
Musical groups disestablished in 2006
Sadcore and slowcore groups
American shoegaze musical groups
New-age music groups
Musical groups established in 1994
Ethereal wave musical groups